Şişli Greek Orthodox Cemetery , also known as  Şişli Eastern Orthodox Cemetery, is a Christian cemetery in Istanbul,  Turkey. The burial ground is the final resting place of people professing the  Orthodox faith  in Istanbul.  The cemetery is located in Şişli district of Istanbul just across the Cevahir Mall.

History and description
The cemetery was founded in 1859, and consists mostly of Greek graves as well as other Orthodox nationalities and ethnoreligious groups such as Russians, Serbians, Bulgarians, Arab and Turkish/Turkic Christians. The burial ground occupies , and since its opening,a total of roughly 85,000 individuals have been interred at the site with 3–4 burials taking place weekly.

Cemetery chapel
The funerary church is referred to as Metamorphosis ("Our Lord Saviour´s Transfiguration"). The inscription says that the church was erected in 1888 at the expense of Schilizzi Stephanovik's sons "in eternal memory of their parents".

Selected notable burials
A few of the notables buried here are:
 Eleni Fotiadou (1921–2001), photojournalist
 Anastasia Georgiadou (1891–1936), singer known as "Deniz Kızı Eftalya"
 Demetrius Stefanovich Schilizzi (1839–1893)
 Georgios Zariphis (1810–1884), prominent Greek Ottoman banker and financier

External links and references

 Agelastos Family Genealogy Pages – Sisli Greek Orthodox Cemetery

Cemeteries in Istanbul
Eastern Orthodox cemeteries
Şişli
Greek Orthodoxy in Turkey
Greeks in Istanbul
Religious buildings and structures completed in 1859
Russian diaspora in Turkey
19th-century architecture in Turkey